Super Wings (Korean: 출동! 슈퍼윙스) is an animated television series co-produced by Funny-flux Entertainment in South Korea, Qianqi Animation in China and Little Airplane Productions in the United States, with the production support from the Educational Broadcasting System and CJ E&M in South Korea.

Series overview

Episodes
For some reasons, episode numbers in original South Korean version are different to international versions (e.g. The Right Kite is the first episode of international version, while Shadow Play is first episode in South Korea).

Season 1 (2013–2016)

Season 2 (2017)
 This is the last German dubbed-season

Season 3: Mission Teams (2018–19)

Season 4: Supercharge (2019–20)

Season 5: Super Pets – (2020–21)

Season 6: World Guardians (2021–22)

References

External links

Lists of Chinese animated television series episodes
Lists of South Korean animated television series episodes